Jochen Heck (born 27 July 1947) is a German rower who represented West Germany. He competed at the 1968 Summer Olympics in Mexico City with the men's coxless four where they came sixth.

References

1947 births
Living people
German male rowers
Olympic rowers of West Germany
Rowers at the 1968 Summer Olympics
Sportspeople from Bremen